Events from the year 1946 in Michigan included the emergence of anti-graft crusader Kim Sigler and his election as governor, a strike by the United Auto Workers, and supply-chain problems that slowed production in the automobile industry. The year's major sports stories included the 1946 Detroit Tigers finishing second in the American League with Hal Newhouser winning 26 games and finishing second in voting for the most valuable player award. Notable deaths in 1946 included former Michigan football coach Fielding H. Yost. Notable births in Michigan included comedienne and actress Gilda Radner and writer/director Paul Schrader

Top stories

The Associated Press polled editors of its member newspapers in Michigan and ranked the state's top news stories of 1946 as follows:
 Kim Sigler. Kim Sigler began the year as special prosecutor pursuing government corruption. After 28 months in that position, he was fired in March 1946. A former Democrat, he won the Republican nomination for governor in a four-way contest. He then won the general election in November by more than 350,000 votes, the largest margin for a Michigan governor in a non-presidential year.
 UAW strike. In January, Chrysler and Ford settled their part in the United Auto Workers (UAW) strike of 1945–1946. The last to settle was General Motors on March 13, ending a strike by 175,000 production workers that had lasted for 113 days since November 21, 1945.
 Production problems in the automobile industry. Reduced production was attributed to factors including Office of Price Administration (OPA) price controls on new automobiles (which were finally lifted in November), the UAW strike, and strikes against automobile parts suppliers and in the steel, coal, rail, and Great Lakes shipping industries.
 Tornadoes. Two large tornadoes in June 1946 struck Detroit and Windsor, Ontario, the most devastating being the 1946 Windsor–Tecumseh tornado
 Bank bribery scandal. On July 20, 19 men including the president of Michigan National Bank, were indicted for conspiring to block passage of Michigan's anti-branch bank bill.
 Jackson Prison scandal. In April, a hearing for reinstatement of the fired warden of the Jackson State Prison revealed extensive corruption at the prison, including bribes for whisky, more favorable work assignments, and visits to a house of ill fame.
 Frank McKay trial. Former Republican national committeeman Frank McKay and four others were tried in January and February on charges of corrupting the state liquor control commission. After a month of trial, the judge granted a directed verdict and dismissed the charges. The case had been prosecuted by Kim Sigler.
 Baroda school explosion. The November 13 explosion of a water tank at a school in Baroda, killing one child and endangering 260.
 Cardinal Mooney. On February 18, Detroit Archbishop Edward Aloysius Mooney was elevated by the pope to the status of cardinal.  He was the first cardinal in Michigan.
 Destruction of cottages near Bay City. On March 9, strong winds from a blizzard pushed massive ice floes from Saginaw Bay onto Killarney and Ricomo Beaches near Bay City. The ice reached heights of 40 feet along a two-mile stretch of beach, crushing 100 cottages.

Other stories receiving votes but falling outside the top ten included the following:
 The National Maritime Union's Great Lakes shipping strike;
 OPA exposure of a $3 million black market for cars based in Michigan;
 The trial and conviction of Anthony Lobaido for the rape and slashing of a Detroit child; and
 Celebration of the Detroit Automobile Golden Jubilee.

Office holders

State office holders

 Governor of Michigan: Harry Kelly (Republican)
 Lieutenant Governor of Michigan: Vernon J. Brown (Republican)
 Michigan Attorney General: John R. Dethmers (Republican)/Foss O. Eldred (Republican)
 Michigan Secretary of State: Herman H. Dignan (Republican)
 Speaker of the Michigan House of Representatives: Howard Nugent (Republican)
 Chief Justice, Michigan Supreme Court:

Mayors of major cities

 Mayor of Detroit: Edward Jeffries (Republican)
 Mayor of Grand Rapids: George W. Welsh (Republican)
 Mayor of Flint: Edwin C. McLogan/Edward J. Viall
 Mayor of Saginaw: Harold J. Stenglein
 Mayor of Lansing: Ralph Crego

Federal office holders

 U.S. Senator from Michigan: Homer S. Ferguson (Republican)
 U.S. Senator from Michigan: Arthur Vandenberg (Republican)
 House District 1: George G. Sadowski (Democrat)
 House District 2: Earl C. Michener (Republican)
 House District 3: Paul W. Shafer (Republican)
 House District 4: Clare Hoffman (Republican)
 House District 5: Bartel J. Jonkman (Republican)
 House District 6: William W. Blackney (Republican)
 House District 7: Jesse P. Wolcott (Republican)
 House District 8: Fred L. Crawford (Republican)
 House District 9: Albert J. Engel (Republican)
 House District 10: Roy O. Woodruff (Republican)
 House District 11: Frederick Van Ness Bradley (Republican)
 House District 12: Frank Eugene Hook (Democrat)
 House District 13: George D. O'Brien (Democrat)
 House District 14: Louis C. Rabaut (Democrat)
 House District 15: John D. Dingell Sr. (Democrat)
 House District 16: John Lesinski Sr. (Democrat)
 House District 17: George Anthony Dondero (Republican)

Population

Companies
The following is a list of major companies based in Michigan in 1946.

Also in 1946, Avis Car Rental was founded by Warren Avis in Ypsilanti, Michigan.

Sports

Baseball

 1946 Detroit Tigers season – Under manager Steve O'Neill, the Tigers compiled a 92–62 record and finished second in the American League. The team's statistical leaders included Roy Cullenbine with a .335 batting average and Hank Greenberg with 44 home runs and 127 RBIs. Hal Newhouser led the pitching staff with a 26-9 record and a 1.94 ERA. Newhouser finished second in the MVP voting behind Ted Williams.
 1946 Michigan Wolverines baseball season - Under head coach Ray Fisher, the Wolverines compiled an 18–3 record and finished second in the Big Ten Conference. Bliss Bowman was the team captain.

American football
 1946 Detroit Lions season – The Lions compiled a 1–10 and finished last in the NFL Western Division.
 1946 Michigan Wolverines football team – Led by head coach Fritz Crisler, the Wolverines compiled a 6–2–1 record and were ranked No. 6 in the final AP poll. Statistical leaders included Bob Chappuis with 735 passing yards and 548 rushing yards.
 1946 Michigan State Spartans football team – Under head coach Charlie Bachman, the Spartans compiled a 5–3–1 record.
 1946 Detroit Titans football team – Under head coach Chuck Baer, the Titans compiled a 6–4 record.
 1946 Central Michigan Chippewas football team - Under head coach Ron Finch, the Chippewas compiled a 6–2 record.
 1946 Western Michigan Broncos football team - Under head coach John Gill, the Broncos compiled a 5–2–1 record.
 1946 Michigan Tech Huskies football team - Under head coach Rex Benoit, the Huskies compiled a 3–2 record. 
 1946 Michigan State Normal Hurons football team - Under head coach Elton Rynearson, the Hurons compiled a 3–4–1 record.
 1946 Michigan Intercollegiate Athletic Association football season - The Hilllsdale Dales and Kalamazoo Hornets tied for the MIAC championship.

Basketball
 1945–46 Michigan Wolverines men's basketball team – Under head coach Bennie Oosterbaan, the Wolverines compiled a 12–7 record. Dave Strack was the team captain. Glen Selbo was the leading scorer.

Ice hockey
 1945–46 Detroit Red Wings season – The Red Wings compiled a 20–20–10 record and finished fourth in the NHL. The team's statistical leaders included Joe Carveth with 35 points and 18 assists and Adam Brown with 20 goals.

Boxing

 June 19 - Detroit's Joe Louis defeated Billy Conn at Yankee stadium to retain his world heavyweight championship.
 September 18 - Joe Louis defeated Tami Mauriello before a crowd of 38,494 in New York. The fight lasted only two minutes and nine seconds.

Boat racing
 APBA Gold Cup – Bandleader Guy Lombardo, racing in his boat, the Tempo VI, won the American Power Boat Association's Gold Cup boat race on the Detroit River.
 Port Huron to Mackinac Boat Race –

Golfing
 Michigan Open - Chuck Kocsis won the Michigan Open golf tournament, held at the Black River Country Club course in Port Huron, Michigan.

Chronology of events

January
 January 3 - The Detroit Tigers traded Rudy York to the Boston Red Sox in exchange for Eddie Lake
 January 26 - Ford and Chrysler reach agreements with the UAW raising wages by 18-1/2 cents per hour  at Chrysler and 18 cents an hour at Ford. The strike continued as to GM with Walter Reuther declaring that the UAW would not settle for less than 19-1/2 cents from GM.

February
 February 13 - Judge John Simpson freed former state Republican Party boss Frank D. McKay and four others, granting a directed verdict after a month-long trial of the five men on charges of corruption in the administration of the state's liquor control commission. The case had been prosecuted by Kim Sigler who was elected as Michigan governor nine months later.
 February 18 - Edward Aloysius Mooney, archbishop of Detroit, was elevated in Rome by Pope Pius XII to the Sacred College of Cardinals. He became Detroit's first cardinal.
 February 18 - Detroit Tigers slugger Hank Greenberg disclosed his wedding to heiress Caral Glazier Gimbel, daughter of the New York department store owner.

March

 March - R. J. Thomas and Walter Reuther engage in a bitter struggle for control of the UAW. Reuther vowed to fight communists within the union. Reuther was elected on March 27 by a narrow margin to replace Thomas as president and made plea for unity. He vowed that no outside groups of Communists, Trotskyites, or Socialists would be allowed to dictate to the union during his leadership. However, the Thomas-Addes faction maintained control of the union's executive board.
 March 9 - Strong winds pushed ice flows onto the Killarney and Ricomo Beaches on Saginaw Bay, five miles north of Bay City. The ice reached heights of 40 feet along a two-mile stretch of beach, crushing 100 cottages.
 March 12 - Kim Sigler was fired as special prosecutor by Judge Louis E. Coash. Sigler had been the Ingham County grand jury special prosecutor for two years. Despite the termination, Sigler was elected as governor in November. One week earlier, Sigler had announced his intention to petition to remove Coach from his supervisory role in Sigler's graft probe.
 March 13 - General Motors reached a settlement with the CIO United Auto Workers, ending the United Auto Workers (UAW) strike of 1945–1946 by 175,000 production workers at the world's largest automobile manufacturer that had lasted for 113 days since November 21, 1945. Workers received a wage rate increase of 18.5 cents (17.5%).

April
 April - The Detroit Street Railroad (DSR) was shut down during the first week of the month by a strike. Workers received a 15-cent wage increase.
 April - The state civil service commission heard the request for reinstatement by former Michigan prison warden Harry H. Jackson. The hearing brought to light evidence of widespread corruption, including bribes for more favorable work assignments, whisky, marijuana, and visits to a house of ill fame.
 April 16 - The Detroit Tigers won on opening day, defeating the St. Louis Browns before a record crowd of 52,118 at Briggs Stadium. Hal Newhouser pitched a sis-hitter, and Hank Greenberg hit a home run.
 April 25 - Frank Lobaido was tried and convicted in Detroit for the rape and attempted murder of seven-year-old Rosalie Giganti on January 27 in the backroom of the Detroit grocery store where Lobaido worked. Lobaido slit the girl's throat and left her in a garage can, but she survived the attack, prayed as she crawled out of the garbage can, and identified Lobaido as her assailant. The jury deliberated for only 12 minutes before convicting Lobaido.

May

 May 4 - As Jimmy Hoffa led the Teamsters in a strike against Detroit meat dealers and grocers, the Detroit Free Press reported that he had emerged as one of the most powerful and autocratic men in Detroit.
 May 19 - The Detroit Tigers split a double-header with the Boston Sox before a record crowd of 58,480 at Briggs Stadium.

June
 May 31 to June 3 - The Automobile Golden Jubilee was celebrated in Detroit. Festivities included painting Woodward Avenue gold with 1,000 gallons of paint, the smashing of a boron atom by the Jubilee Queen, a dramatic musical portrayal of Detroit's history, and an antique automotive exposition. During the atom-smashing ceremony, the grandstand at Grand Circus Park collapsed with several hundred people on it. As part of the jubilee, 14 industry pioneers were inducted into the newly-established automotive hall of fame; the inductees included Frank Duryea, Henry Ford, Charles Nash, Ransom Olds, and Barney Oldfield. William  Durant and Alfred P. Sloan were unable to attend. The Golden Jubilee Parade on June 1 along Woodward Avenue featured floats as well as old and new cars and attracted 750,000 spectators, the largest crowd ever gathered in Detroit.
 June 3 - General Motors announced a shakeup in his leadership with Alfred P. Sloan being replaced as CEO by C.E. Wilson. As part of the reorganization, Detroit was made the corporation's administrative  headquarters.
 June 17 - A tornado struck late in the afternoon in Detroit's downriver River Rouge area and continued across the Detroit River into Canada, killing 20 persons and injuring hundreds. The tornado cut a 400- to 500-yard swath and "leveled blocks of residential and business buildings." Most of the fatalities occurred in Canada.
 June 18
 Kim Sigler won the Republican gubernatorial primary by a 50,000-vote margin over Vernon J. Brown (lieutenant governor), Raymond J. Kelly (former commander of the American Legion), and Edward Jeffries (Detroit mayor). Sigler ran on his reputation as a crusader against government graft and a promise to clean house in Lansing.
 Murray Van Wagoner, who previously served as governor (1941-1943), easily won the Democratic gubernatorial primary by a three-to-one margin over William J. Cody (Wayne County circuit court commissioner).
 June 27 - A tornado strikes near downtown Detroit at 3:37 p.m., injuring at least 20 people and causing extensive property damage.

July
 July 21 - A Lansing grand jury indicted 24 bankers, lawyers, and lawmakers on charges that the bankers sought to bribe legislators to block an anti-chain bank law. The persons charged included Howard J. Stoddard, president of Michigan National Bank. In September 1946, the grand jury's star witness, Charles F. Hemans, refused to return to the state to testify. A federal indictment was then sought to bring Hemans back to Michigan. Hemans was brought back to Michigan at the beginning of October. In December, Hemans was sentenced to four years in prison for violation of a law prohibiting witnesses to flee a state to avoid giving testimony in a felony.
 July 22 - A horse, Valdina Senora, ran into spectators standing along the fence in "the worst horse racing mishap in Michigan history." Seven persons were hurt, including a 58-year-old woman who sustained a skull fracture.
 July 27 - A report by the City Plan Commission reported that Detroit's population was 1,815,000, making it the country's fourth largest city despite a decline of 35,000 from the wartime peak in 1945.

August
 August 15 - The National Maritime Union (NMU) went on strike against the Great Lakes shipping fleet, paralyzing the region's shipping. The strike was marked by violence between NM picketers and representatives of shipping companies.
 August 17 -  Jimmy Hoffa and 17 other Teamsters officials were indicted by a grand jury in Detroit investigating labor racketeering.
 August 20 - Fielding H. Yost, former University of Michigan football coach died.

September
 September 7 Jimmy Hoffa was indicted for the second time in less than a month (see August 17). He was charged along with Orrin A. DeMass (former Liquor Control Commission chairman) and James J. Stewart (chief investigator in the Wayne County prosecutor's office) for asking for $3,000 to halt a liquor commission action against bar owner, Turk Prujansky. Witnesses were placed under police protection on September 25 after Hoffa reportedly told one, "your dumb ... Do you want to get killed?"
 September 18 - More than 50,000 auto workers, including 33,750 at Chrysler, were idled due to a strike at Briggs and resulting part shortages. The Briggs strike was settled on September 21. In October, Prujansky refused to testify before the grand jury and was jailed for contempt.

October
 October 12 - No. 4 Michigan lost a close football game to No. 2 Army.

November
 November 5
 In the 1946 Michigan gubernatorial election, Republican Kim Sigler was elected with 60.28% of the vote, defeating Democrat Murray Van Wagoner.
 In the 1946 United States Senate election in Michigan, Republican Arthur Vandenberg was reelected with 67.06% of the vote, defeating Democrat James H. Lee.
 In the 1946 United States House of Representatives elections in Michigan, Republicans won 14 of 17 races, flipping three seats previously held by Democrats.

 November 13 - The explosion of a  hot-water tank at 11:37 a.m. at the public school in Baroda, Michigan, killed one student, Walter Ruppel (age 14), and injured 18 others. Approximately 250 children were in the school at the time. The Baroda fire chief blamed a faulty safety valve for the explosion.
  November 14 - Ford Motor Co. reported a loss of $51.6 million for the first nine months of the year, prior to adjustments due to tax carrybacks.
 November 23 - Michigan defeated Ohio State, 58-6, in their annual rivalry game.

December
 December 6 - Charlie Bachman resigned as Michigan State's football coach.
 December 30 - Arthur Vandenberg of Michigan was selected as the presiding officer of the U.S. Senate for the 80th Congress.

Births

 January 26 - Deon Jackson, soul singer and songwriter, in Ann Arbor
 January 29 - Bettye LaVette, soul singer-songwriter, in Muskegon
 February 12 - Peter Schoomaker, 35th Chief of Staff of the U.S. Army, in Detroit
 February 17 - Lynne Moody, actress (That's My Mama, Roots), in Detroit
 February 25 - Gary Grimshaw, graphic artist, in Detroit
 March 5 - Dave Porter, NCAA wrestling champion and football player, in Lansing
 April 12 - Lewis N. Dodak, 63rd Speaker of the Michigan House of Representatives (1989-1992), in Saginaw County
 June 28 -  Gilda Radner, actress and comedian, in Detroit
 July 22 - Paul Schrader,  screenwriter (Taxi Driver, Raging Bull) and film director (American Gigolo), in Grand Rapids, Michigan
 September 7 - Pete Camarata, labor activist and Teamsters leader, in Detroit
 October 17 - Herb Orvis, defensive tackle in the NFL (1972–1981), in Petoskey, Michigan
 November 2 - Tom Paciorek, MLB player (1970-1987), in Detroit
 December 14 - Joyce Vincent Wilson, singer in Tony Orlando and Dawn, in Detroit

Deaths
 April 8  - Dr. Frank Cody, Detroit  councilman and former president of Wayne University, in Detroit
 August 26 - Fielding H. Yost, University of Michigan football coach (1901–1926), at age 75 in Ann Arbor
 October 4 - Barney Oldfield, automobile racer, at age 68 in Beverly Hills, California
 August 8 - Alva M. Cummins, lawyer and politician, 1922 Michigan Democratic gubernatorial nominee, at age 77 in Okemos
 September 13 - Paul Wurtsmith, "Detroit's top-ranked air ace", at age 40 in a plane crash in North Carolina
 November 28 - Mariah Herndon, freed slave, at age 107 in Detroit

See also
 History of Michigan
 History of Detroit

References